Orlando Luz and Felipe Meligeni Alves were the defending champions but only Meligeni Alves chose to defend his title, partnering Marcelo Demoliner. Meligeni Alves lost in the quarterfinals to Marco Bortolotti and Sergio Martos Gornés.

Diego Hidalgo and Cristian Rodríguez won the title after defeating Bortolotti and Martos Gornés 4–6, 6–3, [10–5] in the final.

Seeds

Draw

References

External links
 Main draw

Internazionali di Tennis Città di Trieste - Doubles